Peter Ebbe (May 4, 1865 – June 3, 1947) was an American politician and businessman.

Born in Denmark, Ebbe emigrated to the United States in 1883 and settled in Wood County, Wisconsin. He was in the lumber business, operated a sawmill, and was a farmer. Ebbe served as postmaster and on the school board. He was also a member of the town board and a fire warden. Ebbe lived in Marshfield, Wisconsin. From 1927 to 1933, Ebbe served in the Wisconsin State Assembly and was a Republican. Ebbe died at his home in Arcadia, California.

Notes

1865 births
1947 deaths
Danish emigrants to the United States
People from Marshfield, Wisconsin
Businesspeople from Wisconsin
Wisconsin city council members
School board members in Wisconsin
Republican Party members of the Wisconsin State Assembly
Wisconsin postmasters